Kingscote Airport  is located  southwest of Kingscote, South Australia, the main town on Kangaroo Island, in the locality of Cygnet River. The airport is the sole airport for Kangaroo Island. The airport is served by regular public transport and many charter flights. The airport is managed by the Kangaroo Island Council, which has operated the airport since 16 June 1983.

A runway upgrade and new terminal building were completed in May 2018, and officially opened by Prime Minister Malcolm Turnbull and Premier of South Australia, Steven Marshall, on 4 July 2018.

Airline history
Guinea Airways operated the first commercial service to Kangaroo Island, commencing in the 1930s. In 1959, the airline was acquired by Airlines of South Australia (ASA), a subsidiary of Ansett Airlines. The airline's final service was on 4 April 1986. ASA primarily operated Convairs, Douglas DC-3 and Fokker F-27 aircraft. A Piaggio P166 was used infrequently in the 1970s, whilst Rossair operated Cessna 402s in an arrangement with ASA to replace the F27s in off-peak times.

Following the withdrawal of ASA, Kendell Airlines (another Ansett subsidiary), operated 19-seat Fairchild Metroliners and 34 seat SAAB aircraft to the Island. Upon Ansett's ultimate demise in 2002, Regional Express (Rex) acquired the Kendell aircraft and continued services which were later dropped.

In competition with the larger aircraft, and generally with more flexible timetables, a succession of smaller airlines from the 1980s tried with varying success to maintain a 'second string' presence. The most successful, Emu Airways, commenced in 1980 and made its final flight in November 2005. Emu flew Piper Chieftain aircraft to Kingscote, American River, Penneshaw and Parndana, before air regulations dictated abandonment of all airstrips except Kingscote. Air Kangaroo Island (formerly Air Transit), flew Cessna 402s to the island during the 1990s. Keith Stevens operated Albatross Airlines for much of the 1980s and early 1990s.

From 1986 to 1990, Lloyd Aviation operated Embraer EMB 110 Bandeirante aircraft, before flying the Irish-made Short 330. For several years during the 1980s, Commodore Airlines (eventually becoming State Air) offered another alternative service. QantasLink briefly operated a service after the demise of Emu Airways, commencing 18 December 2005, but withdrew less than six months later. Qantaslink also operated direct flights from Kangaroo Island to Melbourne, the first time the route was operated. Air South started operations using a Cessna Titan in January 2007 but ceased regular flights on 17 October 2009.

Qantaslink announced they will commence year round services to Adelaide and seasonal services to Melbourne from December 2017.

On 3 February 2020, Regional Express announced it was exiting the flights to Adelaide before a reversal of the decision on 22 March 2021. However in 2022 Rex pulled of Kangaroo Island.

Airlines and destinations

Statistics
Kingscote Airport was ranked 60th in Australia for the number of revenue passengers served in financial year 2010–2011.

See also
 List of airports in South Australia

References

External links
 Kingscote Airport Retrieved 4 January 2021.
 Regional Express Retrieved 4 January 2021.

Airports in South Australia
Kangaroo Island